Canyon Lady is a jazz album by Joe Henderson. It was recorded in 1973, but not released until 1975. It is an unusual album, one of Henderson's most experimental efforts. Far from being a standard jazz project, Canyon Lady incorporates very strong Latin American influences in the brass arrangements and rhythm section playing. Henderson's work is characterized by intense ostinato patterns. The first two pieces also feature creative electric piano solos by George Duke. The many musicians involved in the project include trombonist Julian Priester, bassist  John Heard, drummer Eric Gravatt, a brass section and percussionists.

Track listing 
 "Tres Palabras" (Osvaldo Farres) – 10:11
 "Las Palmas" (Joe Henderson) – 9:58
 "Canyon Lady" (Mark Levine) – 9:07
 "All Things Considered" (Mark Levine) – 8:37

Recorded on October 1 (#1), 2 (#4) and October 3 (#2-3), 1973.

Personnel 
 Joe Henderson – tenor saxophone
 Mark Levine – acoustic piano
 John Heard – double bass
 Eric Gravatt – drums
 Carmelo Garcia – timbales
 Victor Pantoja – congas
 Julian Priester – trombone (1, 3, 4)
 Luis Gasca – trumpet (2, 3, 4), flugelhorn (3, 4)
 George Duke – electric piano (1, 2, 3)
 Oscar Brashear – trumpet (1, 3, 4)
 John Hunt – trumpet (1)
 Hadley Caliman – flute (1), tenor sax (3)
 Ray Pizzi – flute (1)
 Vincent Denham – flute  (1)
 Nicholas Tenbroek – trombone (1)
 Francisco Aguabella – congas (4)

Additional personnel 
 Tony Lane – cover photography
 Jim Stern – recording engineer

References 

1975 albums
Joe Henderson albums
Milestone Records albums
Albums produced by Orrin Keepnews